The List of French-language television channels includes the following channels:

Belgium

Canada

France

Switzerland

Algeria 
 Programme National
 Canal Algérie
 Berbère Télévision
 Berbère Music
 Berbére Jeunesse
 Beur TV
 Dzaïr TV

See also
 Lists of television channels
 List of French television series
 List of Quebec television series

French